The Basilica of the Nativity of Mary or Basilica of Our Lady of Victories is a Roman Catholic parish church located at Senglea, Malta. It is dedicated to the Nativity of the Virgin Mary.

History
It was most probably built by the architect Vittorio Cassar in 1580 as a monument to the Christian Victory after the Great Siege of 1565.  Senglea became a parish in 1581, and was consecrated on 20 October 1743. On 21 May 1786, Pope Pius VI declared the church to be a "collegiata insignis" (distinguished collegiate church), while in 1921, Pope Benedict XV honoured the church with the title of Basilica. After the crowning of the statue of the Virgin Mary on 4 September 1921, the church became a sanctuary of the Virgin Mary.

The church was destroyed by bombs in 1941, but was rebuilt and consecrated by Archbishop Gonzi on 24 August 1956.

The church building is listed on the National Inventory of the Cultural Property of the Maltese Islands.

Works of art
The main attraction of the basilica, a wooden statue of Mary, known as Il-Bambina, was carved in 1618, painted in 1631 and gilded. The sculptor of this statue is still unknown. After the coronation of the statue of Mary in 1921, the church became a sanctuary. The crown contains diamonds and other precious stones. Around the statue are four silver angels created in 1934. In 1956 another existing marble statue, which was consecrated in 1956 was erected. There are four busts of Pope Benedict XV, Archbishop Mauro Caruana, the symbol of Senglea and the Grand Master La Sengle. The columns show 16 saints who are connected with Maria: Four Evangelists, four popes, four Doctors of the Church and the four founders of Christian orders. Furthermore, the church houses seven bells.

Manuscripts
In the Basilica there are many manuscripts dating back to the 17th and 18th centuries. These are located in the Archives and Study Room of the Basilica, located behind the main building. The study room is named after Dom Mauro Inguanez, a Senglea-born Benedictine abbott at Montecassino Abbey. He was instrumental in saving various manuscripts when the abbey was bombarded in 1944, during WW2. Inguanez was instrumental in the bestowing of the title of minor basilica to the Senglea parish as well as the crowning of the statue of the Virgin Mary.

Notable manuscripts found in the archives include a diary written by Francesco Saverio Baldacchino. This diary can shed light on the last years of the Knights in Malta, the French occupation of Malta and the early year of British rule. Currently, this diary is being studied and transcribed by Maltese scholars at the University of Malta.

See also 

Culture of Malta
History of Malta
List of Churches in Malta
Religion in Malta

References

External links 
 The Basilica on the Archdiocese of Malta website
 The Basilica on Senglea.net

Churches completed in 1580
16th-century Roman Catholic church buildings in Malta
Collegiate churches in Malta
Senglea
Basilica churches in Malta
National Inventory of the Cultural Property of the Maltese Islands